The Senyavin Islands belong to the Federated States of Micronesia. They consist of a larger volcanic Pohnpei Island (about 334 km2) and two small atolls Ant and Pakin.

History

On Pohnpei, pre-colonial history is divided into three eras: Mwehin Kawa or Mwehin Aramas (Period of Building, or Period of Peopling, before ca. 1100); Mwehin Sau Deleur (Period of the Lord of Deleur, ca. 1100 to ca. 1628); and Mwehin Nahnmwarki (Period of the Nahnmwarki, ca. 1628 to ca. 1885). Pohnpeian legend recounts that the Saudeleur rulers, the first to bring government to Pohnpei, were of foreign origin. The Saudeleur centralized form of absolute rule is characterized in Pohnpeian legend as becoming increasingly oppressive over several generations. Arbitrary and onerous demands, as well as a reputation for offending Pohnpeian deities, sowed resentment among Pohnpeians. The Saudeleur Dynasty ended with the invasion of Isokelekel, another semi-mythical foreigner, who replaced the Saudeleur rule with the more decentralized nahnmwarki system in existence today.

He did not approach more closely as he sighted five boats that gave chase. John Bull was lightly armed and so Row was unwilling to interact with them, choosing instead to sail on. He believed the islands were unknown and so named them "John Bull's Islands". In 1828 Russian navigator Fyodor Litke named the group after Russian admiral Dmitry Senyavin.

Notes

References

Islands of Pohnpei